Gymnosperma is a genus of North American flowering plants in the family Asteraceae.

The only known species is Gymnosperma glutinosum, native to Mexico, Guatemala, and the southwestern United States (Arizona, New Mexico, Texas). The species is sometimes known by the common name gumhead.

References

External links
photo of herbarium specimen at Missouri Botanical Garden, collected near Matamoros in 1830, type specimen of Gymnosperma corymbosum Note that label does not specify which side of the Río Grande; Texas was still part of Mexico in 1830
Aggie Horticulture, Texas A&M University,  Tatalencho, Nakedseed Weed, Jarilla, Moto, Mariquita, Motita, Cola de Zorro, Xonequitl, Hierba Pegajosa, Jucu Ndede, Zazal, Escobilla, Pegajosa
New Mexico Flores photos
ギムノスペルマ・グルティノスム (Gymnosperma glutinosum) photos w captions in Japanese

Monotypic Asteraceae genera
Flora of Mexico
Flora of the Southwestern United States
Flora of Guatemala
Astereae
Plants described in 1818